Borhane Alaouié (1 April 1941 – 9 September 2021) was a Lebanese film director. He directed ten films since 1975. His debut film Kafr kasem was entered into the 9th Moscow International Film Festival where it won a Diploma. His 1981 film Beyroutou el lika was entered into the 32nd Berlin International Film Festival.

Filmography
 Kafr kasem (1975)
 Il ne suffit pas que dieu soit avec les pauvres (1978)
 Beyroutou el lika (1981)
 A Letter from a Time of War (1985)
 Lettre d'un temps d'exil (1990)
 Assouan, le haut barrage (1992)
 The Gulf War... What Next? (1993)
 A toi où que tu sois (1999)
 Khalass (2007)
 Mazen wal namla (2008)

References

External links

1941 births
2021 deaths
Lebanese film directors
People from Nabatieh District